The Swiss Federal Institute of Intellectual Property (French: Institut fédéral de la propriété intellectuelle, IPI; German: Eidgenössisches Institut für Geistiges Eigentum, IGE; Italian: Istituto federale della proprietà intellettuale), based in Bern, is an agency of the federal administration of Switzerland responsible for patents, trademarks, geographical indications, industrial designs and copyright.

It is part of the Federal Department of Justice and Police. Since 1996, it operates as an autonomous agency with control of its own budget.

History 
The Federal Intellectual Property Agency was founded on 15 November 1888. Albert Einstein worked there as a patent clerk for several years, including 1905, his Annus Mirabilis (miracle year). That year, while continuing to work on patents, Einstein published four groundbreaking papers that are fundamental to modern physics.

The agency was renamed the Federal Office of Intellectual Property in 1978 as part of the new administrative organisation law. On 1 January 1996, it received the status of an independent public law institution and continued under the name of the Swiss Federal Institute of Intellectual Property (IPI).

Mandate and services 
The Swiss Federal Institute of Intellectual Property's (IPI) tasks are laid down in its own Federal Act on the Statute and Tasks of the Swiss Federal Institute of Intellectual Property:
 The granting of intellectual property (IP) rights: The IPI is the central point of contact for patent, trade mark and design applications in Switzerland and, depending on the procedure, also for international applications. It examines national applications, grants IP rights and administers the relevant registers. Its official organ for publishing IP rights is the online database Swissreg. Information from the IP registers on IP rights and protected topographies can be found in this database free of charge.
 Sovereign duty to provide information: The IPI informs industry stakeholders, educational institutions and the public about the intellectual property protection systems and how they can be utilised to the best advantage.
 Political services: The IPI prepares legislation on patents for inventions, designs, copyright and related rights, topographies of semiconductor products, trade marks and indications of source, public coats of arms and other public signs, as well as other enactments in the field of intellectual property. It advises the federal authorities and represents Switzerland in all intellectual property issues in international organisations and in negotiations with third states.
 Commercial information services: The IPI carries out patent searches on the basis of private law under the label of ip-search; in particular, it carries out prior art searches, validity searches (opposition searches), patent infringement searches (freedom-to-operate) and strategic patent analyses.

The IPI examines patent applications but this examination, as of 2021, does not include checking whether the invention meets the novelty and inventive step requirements.

Notable employees 
Directors General
 1888 – 1921 Friedrich Haller
 1921 – 1935 Walther Kraft
 1935 – 1962 Hans Morf
 1962 – 1969 Joseph Voyame (1923–2010)
 1969 – 1975 Walter Stamm
 1976 – 1985 Paul Brändli
 1985 – 1989 Jean-Louis Comte
 1989 – 2015 Roland Grossenbacher (born 1950)
 2015 – present Catherine Chammartin
Technical experts
 1902 – 1909 Albert Einstein (1879–1955)

See also 
 Copyright law of Switzerland
 Swiss Federal Patent Court
 Swiss made

References

External links 
 
 IPI’s ip-search patent searches
 Swissreg IP rights database

1888 establishments in Switzerland
Patent offices
Intellectual Property
Intellectual Property
Swiss intellectual property law
Swiss patent law